Periya Karuppa Thevar (1936 - 18 September 2012) was a Tamil film character artiste and folk singer who appeared in Tamil-language films.

Film career
PKT was part of the drama troupe floated by veteran Sankaradoss Swamigal more than fifty years ago. Like many actors of his era, he had made the grade to films as an actor after toiling hard on stage where he used to be quite popular for his acting as well as in singing many folk songs.

His film career has spanned many decades in which he had starred in more than 200 films including a memorable role in Bharathiraaja's Mann Vasanai and in Gangai Amaren's Karagattakkaran which had memorable songs by Ilaiyaraaja. PKT has also sung a festival song in Kamal Haasan's Virumandi a few years back.

He has four sons. One of his sons Virumandi, a director made his directorial debut with Ka Pae Ranasingam (2020).

Partial filmography

Death
He died on 10 September 2012 and was survived by his four sons. He had suffered a massive cardiac arrest at his Saligramam residence and died in hospital.

References

External links
 

Male actors in Tamil cinema
Indian male film actors
1937 births
2012 deaths
People from Madurai district
Date of birth missing